Arctostaphylos canescens, common name hoary manzanita, is a species of manzanita.

Distribution
Arctostaphylos canescens is native to the coastal mountain ranges of southwestern Oregon and northern California, where it grows in forest and chaparral plant communities.

Description
Smaller branches and twigs are hairy to woolly. The smooth-edged leaves are oval in shape and pointed at the tip, woolly to rough and waxy, and up to 5 centimeters long.

The plant blooms in dense inflorescences of whitish, urn-shaped manzanita flowers which are woolly inside. The fruit is a hairy drupe 0.5 to 1 centimeter wide.

External links
Jepson Manual Treatment - Arctostaphylos canescens
USDA Plants Profile; Arctostaphylos canescens
Arctostaphylos canescens - Photo gallery

canescens
Flora of California
Flora of Oregon
Flora of the Klamath Mountains
Natural history of the California chaparral and woodlands
Natural history of the California Coast Ranges
Natural history of the San Francisco Bay Area
Plants described in 1897
Flora without expected TNC conservation status